Waka hurdling, also sometimes called waka peke (jumping waka), is a Maori sporting competition of jumping unornamented river canoes (waka tīwai) (waka (canoe)) over wooden beams set in the water. There have been attempts to revive the sport and keep the tradition going. The Auckland Museum has a photograph of the sport and spectators. The hurdles are made of long tree branches. Albert Percy Godber photographed the sport in 1910. The competition is part of the festivities of traditional Maori regattas.

See also
Waka-jumping

References

Māori sport
Jumping sports